Church Stretton railway station is a railway station serving the town of Church Stretton in Shropshire, England on the Welsh Marches Line,  south of Shrewsbury railway station; trains on the Heart of Wales Line also serve the station. All trains services are operated by Transport for Wales, who also manage the station.

The station is the highest point of the line between Shrewsbury and Craven Arms, and is the highest station in Shropshire.

History

The station opened on 20 April 1852 as part of the newly created Shrewsbury and Hereford Railway. It was originally to the north of what is now Sandford Avenue and the old station building still remains, but is no longer in railway use. Sandford Avenue had been for centuries called Lake Lane and became Station Road with the arrival of the railway in the town, before becoming Sandford Avenue in 1884. The original station building was designed by Thomas Mainwaring Penson.

In 1914, the station was relocated just to the south of the Sandford Avenue road bridge. New station buildings were erected, but these were demolished in 1970, the station having become unstaffed in 1967. Today, the only station structures in use are two passenger shelters on the platforms and a footbridge.

Today's station

The station has two platforms, one for northbound services (platform 1) and the other for southbound services (platform 2), with a footbridge crossing the line connecting the two platforms. The platform shelters were replaced and electronic information displays were installed in 2011. CCTV was also installed and together with the new shelters has resulted in anti-social behaviour becoming almost non-existent at the station. In 2013, a ticket machine was installed on platform 1.

There are two small areas for car parking/dropping off on either side of the line – one can be accessed from Sandford Avenue (the B4371), the other from Crossways, off the A49.

Volunteering

The station has been adopted by local volunteers and is kept tidy by them, including the garden areas behind both platforms. In 2008, a group of volunteers transformed the unattended station gardens and two years later won the Station Gardens of the Year competition. In 2011, a tree sculpture depicting two owls was carved by David Bytheway. There is also a Church Stretton Rail Users' Association. The main passenger footbridge connecting the two platforms was renovated and painted in 2013.

Services

For a town of its size, Church Stretton is comparatively well served by trains, although services are less frequent on Sundays. A number of passenger services operating on the Welsh Marches Line do not stop at Church Stretton, particularly on weekdays.

On weekdays, northbound trains run to Shrewsbury, and most continue to ultimate destinations such as Manchester Piccadilly and Holyhead. Southbound trains mostly run to Cardiff Central or beyond via the Welsh Marches Line, but four run to Swansea via the Heart of Wales Line.

Passenger use
The station has a large number of passengers using it considering the town has a population of just 5,000 and is the eighth most-used station in Shropshire. The high usage can be explained by two reasons: the town is a popular tourist destination and many of its inhabitants travel to Shrewsbury and Ludlow for employment, education and shopping.

Infrastructure

The track through the station is prone to flooding when heavy rain occurs as, although at the apex of the line, it is at the bottom of the valley in which Church Stretton lies and is effectively a saddle point. In the wet autumn of 2000, the space between the two platforms filled with water and train services had to be cancelled along the line.

Following serious flooding of the railway in 2000, the signal box at Church Stretton, to the north of the Sandford Avenue bridge, was "switched out" and closed in 2004. The set of points at the station lay defunct before being removed in 2009, together with the box (built 1872) and all signals. Control of the line has been transferred to Marsh Brook signal box to the south.

Bus connections
Church Stretton is served by the 435 Shrewsbury-Ludlow bus, operated by Minsterley Motors, which runs Monday-Saturday. This connects the town with nearby villages including All Stretton, Dorrington, Leebotwood, Little Stretton and Marshbrook. In addition, there are two Shropshire Hills Shuttles services that operate at weekends and on Bank Holidays in the spring and summer. One route runs over the Long Mynd to Ratlinghope and Bridges, Stiperstones, Habberley, Pulverbatch, Minsterley and Pontesbury. The other route, called the "Wenlock Wanderer", runs to Much Wenlock via Little Stretton, Marshbrook, Acton Scott, Ticklerton and then along the B4371 which runs atop the Wenlock Edge to the market town of Much Wenlock. Bus services run to and from Beaumont Road,  from the station.

References

Further reading

External links

Church Stretton
Railway stations in Shropshire
DfT Category F1 stations
Former Shrewsbury and Hereford Railway stations
Railway stations in Great Britain opened in 1852
Railway stations served by Transport for Wales Rail
Thomas Mainwaring Penson railway stations
1852 establishments in England